Euproctis melanosoma is a species of moth of the family Erebidae. It is known from New South Wales, Queensland, Tasmania and Victoria.

The wingspan is about 30 mm. Adults are completely white, except for the black compound eyes and some brown hairs along the inner margins of the forewings. The abdomen starts white, but often becomes black. There is a yellow tuft on the tail of the females.

The larvae feed on the leaves and flowers of various plants, including Sechium edule, Quercus species, Pelargonium x zonale, Dietes grandiflora, Lophostemon confertus, Poaceae species, Rosa odorata and Vitis vinifera. They are black and hairy, with two bright red spots on the back. Full-grown larvae are about 30 mm long. Pupation takes place in a thin brown cocoon under a leaf or petal of the foodplant.

References

Lymantriinae
Moths described in 1882